Kalmbach is a surname of German origin derived from the name of a habitation, Kalmbach on the river Enz. 

Notable people with the surname include:

 Al C. Kalmbach (1910-1981), American publisher and founder of Kalmbach Media
 Edwin Richard Kalmbach (1884—1972), American ecologist
 Gudrun Kalmbach (born 1937), German mathematician
 Herbert Warren Kalmbach (1921–2017), American involved in the Watergate scandal